Rimma Petrovna Aldonina (b. March 7, 1928, Moscow) is a Russian architect and children's poet.

Biography 
Aldonina was born in Moscow to a working family. Her father was Pyotr Fadeyevich Aldonin (1894-1944), who worked as an accountant before World War II. In 1941, he became the Reserve Officer and was mobilized into the working army, dying in December 1944 in Odessa. Her mother was Mariya Ivanovna Aldonina (1902-1994), a nurse.

Career
Aldonina is an Honorable architect of the Russian Federation, a Member of the Soviet Architects Organization and a Member of the Soviet Writers Organization. She os mostly known for her design of the Elbrus Movie theater (1969) and the reconstruction project of the ZiL House of Culture (1966-1976). She is a participant, soloist, and member of the Collective of Satire Writers ensemble Moscow architects "Kohinor and Reishinka," head of "Reishinski." For her activeness in this she received a medal and the Irina Arhipovoi Foundation prize.

She is one of the writers for the Central Theater of Dolls "Govorit i Pokazivaet GCTK" and "Novosele".

References

Literature

1928 births
Living people
Russian women architects
20th-century Russian architects
Russian children's writers
Russian women children's writers
20th-century Russian women writers
Writers from Moscow
Russian women poets
20th-century Russian poets